Isadora is a ballet created for the Royal Ballet by Kenneth MacMillan to music by Richard Rodney Bennett with a scenario by Gillian Freeman, based on the life and dance of Isadora Duncan.

In following the life of Isadora Duncan, the title role is taken jointly by a ballerina and by an actress, whose spoken text is drawn from sections of the memoirs of Duncan. Following the initial run at Covent Garden and performances New York, the ballet was not seen until revised in consultation with MacMillan's widow, and revived by the company in 2009. The scenario in the ballet concentrates on the dramatic events in Duncan's personal life and her relationships with four of her partners. 

The first performance of Isadora was at the Royal Opera House, Covent Garden on 30 April 1981 with Merle Park in the title role. Designs were by Barry Kay.

The ballet was featured in the 50th anniversary BBC programme 'Right Royal Company', in May 1981 and was filmed by Granada Television with the original cast and broadcast in 1982, subsequently being issued on DVD in 2011 by Odeon Entertainment, as the accompaniment to the 1968 feature film Isadora.

Original cast
 Merle Park – Isadora (dancing)
 Mary Miller – Isadora Duncan (acting role)
 Derek Deane – Oskar Beregi
 Julian Hosking – Edward Gordon Craig
 Derek Rencher – Paris Singer
 Monica Mason – Nursey
 Graham Fletcher – A Sailor
 Laura Connor – Loie Fuller
 Ashley Page – Tango Boy
 Garry Grant – André Caplet
 David Drew – Max Merz
 Ross MacGibbon – Man on the Beach
 Stephen Jefferies – Sergei Esenin

The original score by Bennett was conducted by Barry Wordsworth.

See also
 List of historical ballet characters

References

Ballets by Kenneth MacMillan
Ballets to the music of Richard Rodney Bennett
1981 ballet premieres
Ballets based on actual events
Cultural depictions of Isadora Duncan
Cultural depictions of Sergei Yesenin